Hyampom (Wintun: Xaayin-pom) is a census-designated place (CDP) in Trinity County, California, US.

Its population is 241 as of the 2020 census, remaining the same from the 2010 census.

History
The name "Hyampom" is said to have derived from a Wintu language term xaayin-pom, meaning "slippery place." Hyampom was home to the Whilkut, Chimariko, and Northern Wintun Native American tribes. The explorer Jedediah Strong Smith visited Hyampom in April 1828. The first non-native settler in the area was Hank Young who moved to Hyampom on January 12, 1855.

Geography

There are many small beaches and swimming holes along the wild and scenic river. 
The small valley in the Trinity mountains has a small landing strip, the South Fork Trinity River and Hayfork Creek. 

According to the United States Census Bureau, the CDP covers an area of 20.3 square miles (52.5 km2), all of it land.

Climate
This region experiences warm and dry summers, with no average monthly temperatures above 71.6 °F.  According to the Köppen Climate Classification system, Hyampom has a warm-summer Mediterranean climate, abbreviated "Csb" on climate maps. Despite the warm-summer classification, daily highs reach above 90 degrees Fahrenheit on almost all days in summer, but the marine influenced night temperatures are almost always below 60 degrees and most often around 50. There is snow in the winter, but the elevation is too low for significant snowfall. The nearest large town, Hayfork, which is 700 feet above Hyampom at 2200 feet, gets approximately 20 to 25 inches of snow per year, and the nearest comparable weather station, at Big Flat on the Trinity River, gets 6.7 inches per year. Precipitation totals around 40 to 45 inches a year.

Commerce
The main industries for employment are tourism, winemaking, the local school, county road department, and a children's camp, the Bar 717 Ranch, which was founded by Grover Gates whose family settled in Hyampom in 1901.
In the 1970s, the community was home to the sawmill of Jack Beebe - the large teepee burner of the sawmill is still standing today. The mill employed a number of workers, with "camp" style housing for the families.  Currently, there is a general store, a bar/hardware store, and a bar/grill servicing the town, as well as a vineyard and an antique store.

Demographics

The 2010 United States Census reported that Hyampom had a population of 241. The population density was 11.9 people per square mile (4.6/km2). The racial makeup of Hyampom was 199 (82.6%) White, 0 (0.0%) African American, 20 (8.3%) Native American, 0 (0.0%) Asian, 0 (0.0%) Pacific Islander, 7 (2.9%) from other races, and 15 (6.2%) from two or more races.  Hispanic or Latino of any race were 19 persons (7.9%).

The Census reported that 241 people (100% of the population) lived in households, 0 (0%) lived in non-institutionalized group quarters, and 0 (0%) were institutionalized.  
	
There were 123 households, out of which 19 (15.4%) had children under the age of 18 living in them, 36 (29.3%) were heterosexual living together, 9 (7.3%) had a female householder with no husband present, 10 (8.1%) had a male householder with no wife present. There were 17 (13.8%) unmarried heterosexual partnerships, and 0 (0%) homosexual married couples or partnerships. 52 households (42.3%) were made up of individuals, and 19 (15.4%) had someone living alone who was 65 years of age or older. The average household size was 1.96. There were 55 families (44.7% of all households); the average family size was 2.53.

The population was spread out, with 27 people (11.2%) under the age of 18, 18 people (7.5%) aged 18 to 24, 57 people (23.7%) aged 25 to 44, 96 people (39.8%) aged 45 to 64, and 43 people (17.8%) who were 65 years of age or older.  The median age was 50.7 years. For every 100 females, there were 136.3 males.  For every 100 females age 18 and over, there were 122.9 males.

There were 181 housing units at an average density of 8.9 per square mile (3.4/km2), of which 79 (64.2%) were owner-occupied, and 44 (35.8%) were occupied by renters. The homeowner vacancy rate was 3.7%; the rental vacancy rate was 10.2%.  151 people (62.7% of the population) lived in owner-occupied housing units and 90 people (37.3%) lived in rental housing units.

SchoolsThe elementary school has closed in town. High school and younger children ride the bus twenty four miles one way on the winding mountain road to Hayfork every weekday to attend classes.

Politics

References

External links
 Official website

Census-designated places in Trinity County, California
Trinity Mountains (California)
Census-designated places in California